The 2018 Paf Masters Tour was held October 18 to 21, 2018 at the Vianor Curling Center in Eckerö, Åland, Finland as a part of the 2018–19 curling season. The event was held in a round robin format with six teams advancing to the playoffs. The purse for the event was € 18,000.

In the final, Team Isabella Wranå of Sweden capped off a perfect 6–0 tournament by defeating the previously undefeated Sayaka Yoshimura rink from Japan 5–3 in the final. In the third place game, Tova Sundberg, also of Sweden, doubled up on Aline Fellmann of Switzerland 6–3. To reach the final, Wranå defeated Fellmann 6–4 in one semifinal and Yoshimura beat Sundberg 7–3 in the other.

Teams
The teams are listed as follows:

Round robin standings
Final Round Robin Standings

Round robin results
All draw times are listed in Eastern European Time (UTC+02:00).

Draw 1
Thursday, October 18, 12:30 pm

Draw 2
Thursday, October 18, 4:30 pm

Draw 3
Thursday, October 18, 8:30 pm

Draw 4
Friday, October 19, 9:00 am

Draw 5
Friday, October 19, 12:30 pm

Draw 6
Friday, October 19, 4:00 pm

Draw 7
Friday, October 19, 7:30 pm

Draw 8
Saturday, October 20, 8:30 am

Draw 9
Saturday, October 20, 12:00 pm

Draw 10
Saturday, October 20, 3:30 pm

Playoffs
Source:

Quarterfinals
Saturday, October 20, 7:30 pm

Semifinals
Sunday, October 21, 10:00 am

Third place game
Sunday, October 21, 2:30 pm

Final
Sunday, October 21, 2:30 pm

References

External links
Event Home

2018 in women's curling
International sports competitions hosted by Finland
Women's curling competitions in Finland
Paf Masters Tour
Sport in Åland